Joachim Charles Napoléon Murat, Prince of Pontecorvo (born 3 May 1973 in Neuilly-sur-Seine, France), is a French aristocrat and member of the Bonaparte-Murat family.

Life and family
He is the second child and only son of Joachim, 8th Prince Murat, and of Laurence Marie Gabrielle Mouton. He uses the title of Prince of Pontecorvo, an unofficial title, and is the heir apparent to the title of Prince Murat.

He married civilly Yasmine Lorraine Briki on 5 March 2021 in Paris (10th arrondissement of Paris). On 5 August 2021 they had a son. He received the names of Joachim Georges Laurent Napoléon. 

They married religiously on 22 October 2022 at Les Invalides Cathedral.

Ancestry

See also
House of Bonaparte
Joachim Murat

References

of the First French Empire
|-

1973 births
Living people
20th-century French people
21st-century French people
People from Neuilly-sur-Seine
House of Bonaparte
Murat
French people of American descent